Dolichopteroides binocularis is a species of barreleye found in the tropical and warm temperate waters of the Atlantic, Indian, and Pacific Oceans at depths of from . This species grows to a length of  SL. It was placed in its own genus Dolichopteroides in 2009.

References

Opisthoproctidae
Monotypic ray-finned fish genera
Marine fish genera
Fish of the Atlantic Ocean
Fish of the Indian Ocean
Fish of the Pacific Ocean
Taxa named by Nikolai Vasilyevich Parin